Association Sportive Tefana Football, is a football club from Faaa, Tahiti, French Polynesia. The club plays their home matches at Stade Louis Ganivet. The club became the second French Polynesian team to have reached the final of the OFC Champions League, which they achieved in 2012.

Recent Seasons
In 2010 AS Tefana won the Tahitian Championship for the second time in their history, finishing third in the initial league table but won the Championship Play-off comfortably, finishing nine points ahead of their closest rivals. In the 2010–11 OFC Champions League, Tefana only won one game, over New Zealand's powerhouse Waitakere United.

In 2011, Tefana won their third championship with three rounds remaining. In their return to the O-League, the 2011–12 tournament begun with a record-breaking defeat of 0–10 to Waitakere United. Afterwards Tefana won all its games on the way to the finals, the best result by a Tahitian team since A.S. Pirae featured in the final of the 2006 OFC Club Championship. Auckland City FC wound up defeating Tefana at the 2012 OFC Champions League Final, with a 2–1 in Auckland and 1–0 in Faaa. They also won the Tahiti Cup, and qualified for the 2011–12 Coupe de France, where they were eliminated by Red Star 93.

In 2012, Tefana lost the Tahitian Championship to AS Dragon, but won the Tahiti Cup. On the 2012-13 Coupe de France, they were defeated by GSI Pontivy. The team also signed a three-year partnership with French Ligue 1 team AS Saint-Étienne.

Achievements
Tahiti First Division: 5
 2005, 2010, 2011, 2015, 2016.

Tahiti Cup: 7
 2007, 2008, 2010, 2011, 2012, 2014, 2017.

Tahiti Coupe des Champions: 3
 2007, 2014, 2017.

Coupe T.O.M: 1
2006.

Last seasons

Performance in OFC competitions
OFC Champions League: 3 appearances
2015: –
2012: Finalist
2011: 4° in Group B

Current squad
Squad for the 2019-20 Tahiti Ligue 1

Staff
Coach:
 Xavier Samin

References 

Football clubs in Tahiti
Football clubs in French Polynesia